Senior Advisor to the President is a title used by high-ranking political advisors to the president of the United States. White House senior advisors are senior members of the White House Office. The title has been formally used since 1993.

Responsibilities
Over time, a senior advisor has had responsibility for the following groups:

Current departments (headed by a senior advisor)
 White House Office of Intergovernmental Affairs (Julie Rodriguez)
 White House Office of Public Engagement (Keisha Lance Bottoms)
 American Rescue Plan Coordination aka COVID-19 Relief Plan (Gene Sperling)
 Infrastructure Implementation Coordination (Mitch Landrieu)
 United States Digital Services (Neera Tanden)
 Climate and Clean Energy Innovation & Implementation (John Podesta)

Past departments (previously headed by a senior advisor in past administrations)
 White House Office of Strategic Initiatives
 Office of American Innovation
 White House Office of Political Affairs
 White House Office of Communications

Prior administrations
In prior administrations before 1993, the position of "senior advisor" was a title used for various other purposes. Numerous examples of the position also exist throughout the executive departments and in the branch's independent agencies. For example, the Food and Drug Administration includes a position with the title Senior Advisor for Science; the Department of the Interior has a position with the title Senior Advisor for Alaskan Affairs.

List of senior advisors to the president

Senior advisors to President Bill Clinton

Senior advisors to President George W. Bush

Senior advisors to President Barack Obama

Senior advisors to President Donald Trump

Senior advisors to President Joe Biden

List of advisors to the president

See also

 Counselor to the President
Senior advisor

Notes

Explanatory footnotes

References

Executive Office of the President of the United States
White House Office
United States presidential advisors
1993 establishments in Washington, D.C.